Aattuvanchi Ulanjappol is a 1984 Indian Malayalam film, directed by Bhadran and produced by N. G. John. The film stars Madhu, Mammootty, Lakshmi and Ratheesh in the lead roles. The film has musical score by Shyam.

Cast

Madhu as Viswanathan
Mammootty as Balachandran
Lakshmi as Prameela
Ratheesh as Murali
Sathyakala as Ammini
Thilakan
Ashokan
Beena
Kottayam Santha
Manavalan Joseph
Sankaradi
T. R. Omana
Baiju
Lalithasree
P. R. Menon
Santhakumari
Surekha
T. G. Ravi
Jolly Abraham

Soundtrack
The music was composed by Shyam and the lyrics were written by Puthiyankam Murali.

References

External links
 

1984 films
1980s Malayalam-language films
Films directed by Bhadran